Noakhali-1 is a constituency represented in the Jatiya Sangsad (National Parliament) of Bangladesh since 2014 by H. M. Ibrahim of the Awami League.

Boundaries 
The constituency encompasses Chatkhil Upazila and all but three union parishads of Sonaimuri Upazila: Ambarnagar, Baragaon, and Nateshwar.

History 
The constituency was created for the first general elections in newly independent Bangladesh, held in 1973.

Ahead of the 2008 general election, the Election Commission redrew constituency boundaries to reflect population changes revealed by the 2001 Bangladesh census. The 2008 redistricting altered the boundaries of the constituency.

Members of Parliament

Elections

Elections in the 2010s 
H. M. Ibrahim was elected unopposed in the 2014 general election after opposition parties withdrew their candidacies in a boycott of the election.

Elections in the 2000s 
Ganatantri Party candidate Nurul Islam died days before the 29 December 2008 general election. Voting in the constituency was postponed until 12 January 2009. H. M. Ibrahim, who had earlier withdrawn in favor of Nurul Islam, ran in his place as the Grand Alliance candidate.

Elections in the 1990s

References

External links
 

Parliamentary constituencies in Bangladesh
Noakhali District